Libau Bog Ecological Reserve is an ecological reserve located in the Mars Hill Wildlife Management Area, Manitoba, Canada. It was established in 1989 under the Manitoba Ecological Reserves Act.

Flora 

According to the Government of Manitoba's informational PDF about the site,

See also
 List of ecological reserves in Manitoba
 List of protected areas of Manitoba

References

External links
 iNaturalist: Libau Bog Ecological Reserve

Protected areas established in 1989
Ecological reserves of Manitoba
Nature reserves in Manitoba
Protected areas of Manitoba